This is a list of defunct newspapers of Russia.

 Chronicle of Current Events
 Golos Truda
 Irkutskoye Slovo
 Kuranty
 Luch
 Moskovskiye Vedomosti
 Novaya Zhizn (1905)
 Novaya Zhizn (1917-1918)
 Noviye Sily
 Rabochy
 Rech
 Rodnaya Zemlya
 Rus (1903)
 Sbornik Sotsial-Demokrata
 Sevodnya (1906)
 Strakhovaniye Rabochikh
 Student (publication)
 Ternii Truda
 Tovarishch (newspaper)
 Zhivoye Delo
Znamya (1902?-1903?)
 Znamya Trudovoi Kommuny (1918)

Russia